Pierre-Hugues Herbert and Nicolas Mahut were the defending champions, but lost in the second round to Jay Clarke and Marcus Willis.

Łukasz Kubot and Marcelo Melo won the title, defeating Oliver Marach and Mate Pavić in the final, 5–7, 7–5, 7–6(7–2), 3–6, 13–11. Melo also regained the ATP no. 1 doubles ranking after he and Kubot defeated Henri Kontinen (the incumbent no. 1 player) and John Peers in the semifinals.

Seeds

Qualifying

Draw

Finals

Top half

Section 1

Section 2

Bottom half

Section 3

Section 4

References

 Men's Doubles Draw

External links
2017 Wimbledon Championships – Men's draws and results at the International Tennis Federation

Men's Doubles
Wimbledon Championship by year – Men's doubles